Mariana Nogales Molinelli (born October 26, 1973) is a Puerto Rican lawyer, politician, and social activist. In 2020, she was elected to the House of Representatives of Puerto Rico for the Citizens' Victory Movement (MVC) party. She had previously ran as the Working People's Party of Puerto Rico's candidate for resident commissioner in the 2016 election; she received over 19,000 votes, and ended up in 4th place. She studied environmental sciences at the University of Puerto Rico, where she completed a bachelor's degree in psychology in 2006. In 2010 Mariana Nogales Molinelli earned a juris doctor from the University of Puerto Rico School of Law. She also received the Thurgood Marshall Award from the Puerto Rico Civil Rights Commission.

Activism

Since 2011 Nogales has practiced law on the island in the areas of family matters, civil, penal, labor and  notary laws. From 2009 to 2010 Nogales was coordinator general for the campaign to abolish the death penalty on the island. Nogales is a recognized figure among the Puerto Rican left. She has secular beliefs, and is the founder of Humanistas Seculares de Puerto Rico (Secular Humanists of Puerto Rico, in English) an organization that advocates for the separation of church and state. In 2017 she opposed the declaration of 40 days of prayer and fasting in the House of Representatives.

Nogales is a self-declared feminist. She has collaborated with feminist organizations such as the Movimiento Amplio de Mujeres and Proyecto Matria. In 2021 she supported protest in favour of permanently closing the Dr. Juan A. Rivero Zoo.

At the funeral service for Carlos Romero Barceló Nogales wore a t-shirt protesting the Cerro Maravilla murders that occurred under the governor's tenure.

PPT 
In 2015 Nogales was selected as one of the PPT party leaders subsequently becoming the party president.

House of Representatives 
In 2020 Nogales was elected to the House of Representatives at large with 87,000 votes representing the third largest number of votes.

Nogales was the author of the House of Representatives resolution 213, created to investigate the cutting of trees around the island in an attempt to reduce deforestation.

References

1973 births
Living people
People from Humacao, Puerto Rico
Puerto Rican women in politics
Puerto Rican activists
Puerto Rican women environmentalists
21st-century Puerto Rican lawyers
Puerto Rican atheists
Puerto Rican feminists
Movimiento Victoria Ciudadana politicians
Puerto Rican women lawyers
University of Puerto Rico alumni
Members of the House of Representatives of Puerto Rico
21st-century Puerto Rican women politicians